Xanthomonas pisi is a species of bacteria.

References

External links
Type strain of Xanthomonas pisi at BacDive -  the Bacterial Diversity Metadatabase

Xanthomonadales
Bacteria described in 1958